Pulchelliidae is an extinct ammonoid cephalopod family. It was previously classified as belonging to the superfamily Endemoceratoidea. They lived during the Cretaceous, in the Barremian age.

Subfamilies and genera

 Buergliceratinae
 Psilotissotiinae
 Pulchelliinae (Vermeulen 1995)
 Nicklesia (Hyatt)
 Pulchellia (Uhlid)
 Gerhardtia (Hyatt)
 Coronites (Hyatt)
 Curiolites (Vermeulen)
 Heinzia (Sayn)

Distribution
Fossils of species within this genus have been found in the Cretaceous sediments of Bulgaria, Colombia, France, Mexico, Morocco, Spain, Trinidad and Tobago.

References

External links 

 
 

Ammonitida families
Endemoceratoidea
Cretaceous Morocco
Fossils of Morocco
Cretaceous France
Fossils of France
Cretaceous Spain
Fossils of Spain
Cretaceous Mexico
Fossils of Mexico
Ammonites of South America
Cretaceous Colombia
Fossils of Colombia